Pia Maertens (born 6 January 1999) is a German field hockey player, who plays as a forward.

Career

Junior National Team
In 2019 Pia Maertens made her debut for the Germany U–21 side in a test match against the United States junior national team in Viersen, Germany.

Senior National Teams
Maertens also debuted for the senior national team in 2019, during the inaugural FIH Pro League. During the tournament, Maertens scored 4 goals for Germany, and was a member of the team that won bronze in the Grand Final.

Following her performance in the FIH Pro League, German head coach Xavier Reckinger named Maertens in the final squad for the 2019 EuroHockey Nations Championship in Antwerp, Belgium.

International Goals

References

1999 births
Living people
German female field hockey players
Field hockey players at the 2020 Summer Olympics
Olympic field hockey players of Germany
Sportspeople from Duisburg